The Office of the Children's Commissioner (OCC) is an independent New Zealand Crown entity that was established under the Children's Commissioner Act 2003. Its main responsibilities are to protect the rights, health, welfare, and wellbeing of minors under the age of 18 years.

Functions and responsibilities
The Office of the Children's Commissioner's statutory functions are outlined in the Children's Commissioner Act 2003, the Oranga Tamariki Act 1989 (formerly known as the Children, Young Persons, and Their Families Act 1989), the Oranga Tamariki (Residential Care) Regulations 1996, the Crimes of Torture Act 1989, and the Human Assisted Reproductive Technology Act 2004. Key responsibilities include: 
Protecting the rights, health, welfare, and wellbeing of children and young people under the age of 18 years. 
Monitoring the services provided under the Oranga Tamariki Act 1989.
Developing the means of consultation with children.
Promoting the implementation of the United Nations Convention on the Rights of the Child. 

As the equivalent of office known as the Children's Ombudsman in several countries, the OCC conducts investigations as to whether the rights or welfare of a child or children have been prejudiced. Their investigations can cover almost anything except courts and tribunals. The Children's Commissioner has the power to require information or documentation as part of their investigation.

Under the provisions of the Oranga Tamariki Act 1989 and Oranga Tamariki (Residential Care) Regulations 1996, the OCC has some oversight over Oranga Tamariki (the Ministry of Children), the government department responsible for the well-being of vulnerable children and young people. These responsibilities include encouraging Oranga Tamariki to develop policies and services that meet the welfare needs of children and young people, and receiving reports from Oranga Tamariki inspectors visiting the homes of children in residential care at least once a year.

History
Prior to 2003, the Office of the Children's Commissioner's predecessor was the Commissioner for Children, which was established under Part 9 of the Oranga Tamariki Act 1989 (then known as the Children, Young Persons, and Their Families Act 1989). Following the passage of the Children's Commissioner Act 2003, the OCC assumed the functions and responsibilities of the former Commissioner for Children.

Holders of the office have been of differing opinions on the controversy over the autopsy images of Ngatikaura Ngati.

Proposed replacement

In November 2021, the Sixth Labour Government introduced legislation to replace the Children's Commissioner with two new entities: the "Children and Young People's Commission" that would focus on advocacy and an Independent Children's Monitor who would assume the Commissioner's monitoring responsibilities. In addition, the Ombudsman's Office would also expand its portfolio to investigating complaints relating to children. The proposed law change was driven by the Government's concern that the Office of the Children's Commissioner's advocacy role would clash with its monitoring role. 

The Labour Government's plans to replace the Children's Commissioner attracted criticism from the Children's Commissioner Frances Eivers, several children's advocates including Save the Children, former Oranga Tamariki employee Luke Fitzmaurice, "VOYCE – Whakarongo Mai" spokesperson Tupua Urlich, children's advocate Piwi Beard, Manaaki Rangatahi, Barnardos and the Child Poverty Action Group (CPAG). They expressed concerns that the Government's changes would reduce the office's ability to monitor the wellbeing of vulnerable children and advocate for their interests. In addition, the Government's changes were opposed by its support partner, the Green Party, and the opposition National, ACT, and Māori parties.

Despite vocal civil society and political opposition, the Labour Party was able to use its parliamentary majority to push through two new laws replacing the Children's Commissioner with the Children and Young People's Commission and splitting oversight of the Oranga Tamariki system between the new Independent Monitor and Ombudsman.

List of office holders

Notes and references

External links

New Zealand
New Zealand Crown entities
Ombudsmen in New Zealand